Mitar Milinković (born 29 December 1971) is a Serbian judoka. He competed at the 1992 Summer Olympics as an Independent Olympic Participant, and the 1996 Summer Olympics for FR Yugoslavia.

References

External links
 

1971 births
Living people
Serbian male judoka
Olympic judoka of Yugoslavia
Olympic judoka as Independent Olympic Participants
Judoka at the 1992 Summer Olympics
Judoka at the 1996 Summer Olympics
Place of birth missing (living people)